Starry Night is a 1990 album by Julio Iglesias. It contains covers of popular songs from the 1950s, '60s and '70s.

Track listing

Certification

References

1990 albums
Julio Iglesias albums
Columbia Records albums
Covers albums